The Shigupan Tourist Bridge is a bridge in Alishan Township, Chiayi County, Taiwan.

History
After the 1999 Jiji earthquake cut off the area in Alishan, road infrastructures were reconstructed with a total cost of NT$170 million. The roads were eventually completed in 2007 and the Shigupan Tourist Bridge was also established soon afterwards.

Technical specification
The bridge is a single steel tied-arch bridge which spans over a length of 140 meters and a width of 7.5 meters. The bridge has the longest span in the county. It has 2 lanes and 2 sidewalks each on its side. It features color-changing lights where they are lit up during evening time.

See also
 List of bridges in Taiwan

References

2007 establishments in Taiwan
Bridges completed in 2007
Bridges in Chiayi County
Tourist attractions in Chiayi County